This is a list of English words borrowed from Scottish Gaelic. Some of these are common in Scottish English and Scots but less so in other varieties of English.

Words of Scottish Gaelic origin

 Bard The word's earliest appearance in English is in 15th century Scotland with the meaning "vagabond minstrel". The modern literary meaning, which began in the 17th century, is heavily influenced by the presence of the word in ancient Greek (bardos) and ancient Latin (bardus) writings (e.g. used by the poet Lucan, 1st century AD), which in turn took the word from the Gaulish language.
 Ben From  , mountain.
 Bodach  Old man.
 Bog From bog , soft (related to boglach swamp), from Old Irish bocc. 14th century.
 Bothan  A hut, often an illegal drinking den. (cf Bothy)
 Caber toss An athletic event, from the Gaelic word "cabar" which refers to a wooden pole.
 Cailleach  An old woman, a hag, or a particular ancient goddess.
 Cairn From càrn. The word's meaning is much broader in Gaelic, and is also used for certain types of rocky mountains.
 Caman a shinty stick.
 Capercaillie From capall-coille , meaning "horse of the woods"
 Cèilidh  A 'social gathering' or, more recently, a formal evening of traditional Scottish Social Dancing.
 Canntaireachd oral notation for pipe music.
 Clan From the compound form clann , from clann, children or family. Old Irish cland.
 Claymore A large broadsword, from claidheamh mór , great sword.
 Coire literally a "kettle", meaning a corrie, from the same root.
 Crag From creag , a cliff.
 Deoch an dorus (various spellings)  meaning a "drink at the door". Translated as "one for the road", i.e. "one more drink before you leave".
 Fear an taighe an MC (master of ceremonies), Gaelic lit. "the man of the house"
 Eàrlaid the right sometimes sold by an outgoing to an incoming tenant to enter into possession of the arable land early in Spring.
 Galore From gu leor, enough.
 Gillie a type of servant, now usually somebody in charge of fishing and rivers, and also ghillie suit used as a form of camouflage, from gille , boy or servant.
 Glen From gleann , a valley.
 Gob From gob, beak or bill.
 Kyle or Kyles  Straits from Gaelic Caol & Caolais.
 Loch From loch .
 Lochaber axe  From Loch Abar , Lochaber + axe.
 Mackintosh After Charles Macintosh who invented it. From Mac an Tòisich , son of the chieftain.
 Mod A Gaelic festival, from mòd , assembly, court.
 Pet From peata, tame animal.
 Pibroch From pìobaireachd , piping.
 Pillion From pillean , pack-saddle, cushion.
 Plaid From plaide , blanket. Alternatively a Lowland Scots loanword , from the past participle of ply, to fold, giving plied then plaid after the Scots pronunciation.
 Ptarmigan From tàrmachan . 16th Century.
 Shindig From sìnteag to skip, or jump around
 Slogan From sluagh-ghairm , battle-cry
 Sporran Via sporan  from Old Irish sboran and ultimately Latin bursa, purse.
 Spunk From spong , tinder and also sponge. From Early Irish sponge, from Latin spongia, from Greek σπογγιά, a sponge.
 Strontium from Sròn an t-Sìthein  meaning "the point at the fairy hill", name of a village, near which the element was discovered.
 Tack & Tacksman (a lessee)  From Scots tak (take) cf. Old Norse taka.
 Trousers from triubhas , via "trews".
 Whisky Short form of whiskybae, from uisge-beatha , water of life.

Words of Scottish or Irish Gaelic origin
The following words are of Goidelic origin but it cannot be ascertained whether the source language was Old Irish or one of the modern Goidelic languages.
 Brogue An accent, Irish, or Scottish Gaelic bròg , shoe (of a particular kind worn by Irish and Gaelic peasants), Old Irish bróc, from Norse brókr
 Hubbub Irish, or Scottish Gaelic ubub , an exclamation of disapproval.
 Shanty  Irish or Scottish Gaelic sean taigh , an old house
 Smidgen  Irish or Scottish Gaelic smidean , a very small bit (connected to Irish smidirín, smithereen), from smid, syllable or a small bit.
 Strath Irish, or Scottish Gaelic srath , a wide valley.

Gaelic words mostly used in Lowland Scots

Because of the wide overlap of Scottish English and Lowland Scots, it can be difficult to ascertain if a word should be considered Lowland Scots or Scottish English. These words tend to be more closely associated with Lowland Scots but can occur in Scottish English too.

 Airt Point of the compass, from àird , a point.
 Bothy A hut, from bothan , a hut, cf. Norse būð, Eng. booth.
 Caird A tinker, from ceaird , the plural of ceàrd, tinkers.
 Caber From cabar , pole.
 Cailleach From cailleach , old woman.
 Caman From caman , shinty stick. Also in use in Scotland the derived camanachd, shinty.
 Cateran From ceatharn , fighting troop.
 Ceilidh From céilidh , a social gathering.
 Clachan From clachan , a small settlement.
 Clarsach A harp, from clàrsach , a harp.
 Corrie From coire , kettle.
 Doch-an-doris Stirrup cup, from deoch an dorais , drink of the door.
 Fillibeg A kilt, from féileadh beag , small kilt.
 Ingle From aingeal , a now obsolete word for fire.
 Kyle From caol , narrow.
 Lochan From lochan , a small loch.
 Machair From machair , the fertile land behind dunes.
 Quaich From cuach , a cup.
 Skean From sgian , a knife.
 Slughorn  Also from sluagh-ghairm, but erroneously believed by Thomas Chatterton and Robert Browning to refer (apparently) to some kind of trumpet.

 Inch (in the sense of an island), from Scottish Gaelic innis .
 Och Irish and Scottish Gaelic och , exclamation of regret. Cf. English agh, Dutch and German ach.
 Oe Grandchild, Irish and Scottish Gaelic ogha , grandchild.
 Samhain  Irish and Scottish Gaelic Samhain , November and related to Oidhche Shamhna, Halloween.
 Shennachie Irish and Scottish Gaelic seanchaidh , storyteller.
 Sassenach Irish and Scottish Gaelic Sasannach , An Englishman, a Saxon.

 Abthen (or Abthan) jurisdiction and territory of pre-Benedictine Scottish monastery, from †abdhaine , abbacy.
 Airie shieling, from àiridh , shieling.
 Aiten juniper, from aiteann , juniper.
 Bourach A mess, from bùrach , a mess.
 Car, ker Left-handed, from cearr , wrong, left.
 Crine To shrink, from crìon , to shrink.
 Crottle A type of lichen used as a dye, from crotal , lichen.
 Golack An insect, from gobhlag , an earwig.
 Keelie A tough urban male, from gille , a lad, a young man.
 Ketach The left hand, from ciotach , left-handed.
 Sonse From sonas , happiness, good fortune. Also the related sonsy.
 Spleuchan A pouch, from spliùchan , a pouch, purse.
 Toshach Head of a clan, from toiseach , beginning, front.

Place-name terminology

There are numerous additional place-name elements in Scotland which are derived from Gaelic, but the majority of these have not entered the English or Scots language as productive nouns and often remain opaque to the average Scot. A few examples of such elements are:

a(u)ch- from Gaelic achadh, a field; hence Auchentoshan distillery, Auchinleck
ard- from Gaelic àird, a height or promontory; hence Ardnamurchan, etc.
bal- from Gaelic baile, a town; hence Balgowan, Balgay etc.
cam- from Gaelic camas, a bend or meander; hence Cambuslang, Cambusnethan
dal- from Gaelic dail, a meadow (not to be confused with "dale", from the Norse dalr meaning a valley); hence Dalry
drum- from Gaelic druim, a ridge; hence Drumchapel, Drumnadrochit etc.
dun- from Gaelic dun, a fort; hence Dundee, Dumbarton, Dunedin
inver- from Gaelic inbhir, a river mouth or confluence; hence Inverclyde, Inverleith
kil- from Gaelic cill, a churchyard; hence Kilmarnock, Kilbride etc.
kin- from Gaelic ceann, a head; hence Kinlochleven, Kinloss etc.

See also
 List of English words of Scots origin
 List of English words of Irish origin
 List of English words of Welsh origin
 Lists of English words of Celtic origin
 Lists of English words by country or language of origin

References 

Scottish Gaelic language
Scottish gaelic
Scottish English